Kalmanja is a village in Dakshina Kannada district in Karnataka, India. Kalmanja has around 2000 people, most of whom are farmers and agriculturists. The main language is Tulu. This village belongs to Belthangadi Taluk and is managed by Belthangadi Taluk Panchayat (a government body).

See also
Pajiradka

External links
 Belthangadi Map

Villages in Dakshina Kannada district